Punya Srinivas (Tamil: புண்ய ஸ்ரீனிவாஸ்) is a professional Veena player and vocalist.

She was initiated into music from the age of 6 by Smt. Jayalakshmi from the Music Academy and was later on trained in Veena from Vidushi Smt. Kamala Ashwathama, the mother of renowned Veena artiste E. Gayathri. She is currently pursuing the advanced aspects of Carnatic music from Sangeeta Kala Acharya Suguna Varadachari. She was also exposed to Western classical music by Dr Augustine Paul. Her husband, D. A. Shrinivas is an accomplished mridangam player who usually accompanies her in her concerts.

Career

She was proclaimed an 'A' Grade Artiste of All India Radio when she was 20 years old. Having performed in all the major sabhas in Chennai, she also extended her performances to Hyderabad, Trivandrum, Bangalore, Bombay, Delhi, Calcutta and also abroad in countries like Europe, Belgium, United States, Singapore, New York, London, Dubai, France, Israel and Jerusalem.

She has performed with Ravi Shankar, the world famous sitar maestro in his album, CHANTS, under the production of George Harrison.

She has also collaborated with percussionists, Zakir Hussain, John McLaughlin, Matthew Garrison and U. Srinivas.

She has also played for singer Hariharan in his Ghazal Albums and for Colonial Cousins in one of their albums.

To date, she has released 5000 recordings as a Veena player. She is also known for her versatility and ambidexterity, and has recently performed Bach's double violin concerto with Violinist V. S. Narasimhan. She also composed a tune for the 'Asian Muse', a conceptual Japanese album, comprising women performers from different regions of Asia. With her band, Paanchajanyam, she has brought many different popular musical genres on the Veena.

She launched an album "Veena in Vienna" giving different dimension to the indian instrument Veena which became a global hit.  She followed it up with another album called the "Sound of Swan"

References

https://web.archive.org/web/20120110082602/http://punyasrinivas.com/beginnings

https://web.archive.org/web/20120126041300/http://punyasrinivas.com/bio

https://web.archive.org/web/20120306033120/http://punyasrinivas.com/growth

External links
 Punya Srinivas official website
 The Hindu : Arts / Music : Great musical sensitivity
 The Hindu : Friday Review Chennai / Music : Many meditative moments
 The Hindu : Friday Review Chennai / Columns : 'I go by the music, not the musician'

Saraswati veena players
Musicians from Chennai
Living people
Indian women classical musicians
All India Radio people
All India Radio women
Women musicians from Maharashtra
20th-century Indian women musicians
20th-century Indian musicians
Year of birth missing (living people)